Paul Babiloni (born 16 January 1990) is a French retired footballer.

Career
Babiloni started his career at Guingamp and on 3 May 2012, he signed a one-year professional contract. He made his professional debut on 7 August 2012 in a 1–0 defeat over AC Arles-Avignon in the Coupe de la Ligue, substituting Thierry Argelier. Three days later, he made his league debut starting the game at Angers.

References

External links
 
 

1990 births
Living people
Sportspeople from Limoges
French footballers
Association football defenders
En Avant Guingamp players
AC Ajaccio players
FC Villefranche Beaujolais players
Ligue 2 players
Footballers from Nouvelle-Aquitaine